The Phantom Creeps is a 1939 12-chapter science fiction horror serial starring Bela Lugosi as mad scientist Doctor Zorka, who attempts to rule the world by creating various elaborate inventions. In a dramatic fashion, foreign agents and G-Men try to seize the inventions for themselves.

It is the 112th serial released by Universal Pictures and the 44th to have sound. It was adapted in DC's Movie Comics #6, cover date September–October 1939, the final issue of that title.

In 1949, to broadcast on television, the 265-minute serial was edited to a 78-minute feature film.

Plot
Dr. Zorka, a rogue scientist, is the creator of various weapons of warfare, including a devisualizer belt which renders him invisible; an eight-foot tall slave robot (Ed Wolff), robot spiders that can destroy life or paralyse it and he also has a deadly meteorite fragment from which he extracts an element which can induce suspended animation in an entire army. Foreign spies, operating under the guise of a foreign language school, are trying to buy or mostly steal the meteorite element, while his former partner, Dr. Fred Mallory, miffed that Zorka will not turn his inventions over to the U.S. Government, blows the whistle on him to Captain Bob West of the Military Intelligence Department. Tired of answering the door and saying no to the spies and the government, Zorka moves his lab. When his beloved wife is killed, Zorka, puttering around for his own amusement up to this point, is crushed and swears eternal vengeance against anyone trying to use his creations and to make himself world dictator. And would have if not for his assistant Monk, an escaped convict virtually enslaved by Zorka, who is cowardly, treacherous and totally incompetent, and whose accidental or deliberate interference with Zorka's efforts repeatedly frustrates his master's own plans...

Cast
 Bela Lugosi as Dr. Alex Zorka: Lugosi received top billing for this, his final serial appearance.
 Robert Kent as Capt. Bob West
 Dorothy Arnold as Jean Drew
 Edwin Stanley as Dr. Fred Mallory
 Regis Toomey as Jim Daley
 Jack C. Smith as Monk 
 Edward Van Sloan as Jarvis [Chs.2-12]
 Dora Clement as Ann Zorka [Chs.1-2] (as Dora Clemant)
 Anthony Averill as Rankin - Henchman [Chs.2-12]
 Hugh Huntley as Perkins, Dr. Mallory's lab assistant [Chs.2-12]
 Monte Vandergrift as Al - Guard [Ch.5]
 Frank Mayo as Train Engineer [Ch.6]
 Jim Farley as Skipper [Ch.9] (as James Farley)
 Eddie Acuff as Mac - AMI Agent [Chs.2-12]
 Reed Howes as Signalman [Ch.10]
 Ed Wolff as The Robot (as Edw. Wolff)

Production
The serial contains some similarities with the earlier serial The Vanishing Shadow, such as an invisibility belt and a remote-control robot. Stock footage was used from The Invisible Ray, including scenes of Dr. Zorka finding the meteorite in Africa.  As with several Universal serials, some of the stock music came from Frankenstein.  The Phantom Creeps' car chase was itself used as stock footage in later serials. Newsreel shots of the Hindenburg disaster were used as part of Dr. Zorka's final spree of destruction after his robot, which is supposed to destroy the human race, is stopped due to the sabotage by the Monk after being unleashed.

Universal tried to improve their serials by eliminating the written foreword at the start of each chapter.  This led to The Phantom Creeps being the first serial in which the studio used vertically scrolling text as the foreword.

Influence
The innovation of the scrolling text version of the synopsis at the beginning of each chapter was used for the Star Wars films as the "Star Wars opening crawl".

The Rob Zombie song "Meet the Creeper" is based on this movie. Zombie has used robots and props based on the design of The Robot in several music videos and live shows. The character Murray The Robot in Zombie's animated movie The Haunted World of El Superbeasto is also based on The Robot. The Robot also appears on the album cover for the single "Dragula".

A comic book adaptation was published by DC Comics in Movie Comics #6.

The first three chapters of The Phantom Creeps were riffed in season two of Mystery Science Theater 3000, in the episodes Jungle Goddess, Rocket Attack U.S.A., and Ring of Terror.

Footage from the serial was used in the 1982 video for Automaton by the Canadian band United State.

Chapter titles
 The Menacing Power
 Death Stalks the Highways
 Crashing Timbers
 Invisible Terror
 Thundering Rails
 The Iron Monster
 The Menacing Mist
 Trapped in the Flames
 Speeding Doom
 Phantom Footprints
 The Blast
 To Destroy the World
Source:

See also
 List of film serials by year
 List of film serials by studio
 List of films in the public domain in the United States

References

External links

 (1949 TV film edited from serial)
 (original twelve chapter serial)
 (1949 TV film edited from serial)

Profile in Mike's Amazing World of DC Comics

1939 films
American science fiction films
American black-and-white films
1930s English-language films
1930s science fiction films
Universal Pictures film serials
Films directed by Ford Beebe
Compilation films
Films with screenplays by George H. Plympton
Mad scientist films
1930s American films